Ferenc Ficza Jr. (born 13 May 1996) is a Hungarian racing driver currently competing in the European Touring Car Cup. He previously competed in the TCR International Series and SEAT León Eurocup.

Racing career

Ficza began his career in 2008 in the Hungarian Touring Car Championship. He switched to the Hungarian Suzuki Bio Cup in 2009, he won the championship in 2010. In 2012 Ficza made his European Touring Car Cup debut with XFX Unicorse Team, driving an Alfa Romeo 156. In 2013 he stayed in the European Touring Car Cup but switched to Zengő Motorsport, racing in the Single-makes Trophy. He finished 8th in the championship standings that year. In March 2015, it was announced that Ficza would make his TCR International Series debut with Zengő Motorsport driving a SEAT León Cup Racer. He later returned to the European Touring Car Cup.

Racing record

Complete TCR International Series results
(key) (Races in bold indicate pole position) (Races in italics indicate fastest lap)

† Driver did not finish the race, but was classified as he completed over 90% of the race distance.

Complete World Touring Car Championship results
(key) (Races in bold indicate pole position) (Races in italics indicate fastest lap)

Complete TCR Europe Series results
(key) (Races in bold indicate pole position) (Races in italics indicate fastest lap)

References

External links
 

1996 births
Living people
Hungarian racing drivers
European Touring Car Cup drivers
SEAT León Eurocup drivers
TCR International Series drivers
World Touring Car Championship drivers
Zengő Motorsport drivers
TCR Europe Touring Car Series drivers